This is a partial list of people who follow Confucianism, selected for their influence on that belief, or for their fame in other areas.

Early Confucians 
Confucius (孔夫子 Pinyin: Kong fuzi Wade-Giles: K'ung fu-tzu) – founder
 Zisi (子思)
Mencius (孟子 Pinyin: Meng zi)
Xun Zi (荀子)

Japanese Confucianism 
Fujiwara Seika
Hayashi Razan
Ogyū Sorai
Toju Nakae

Korean Confucianism 
Yi Hwang
Yi I

Vietnamese Confucianism 
 Chu Văn An
 Nguyễn Trãi

Neo-Confucians 
Wang Yangming – important Idealist Neo-Confucian.
Zhang Zai – pioneering Neo-Confucian.
Zhou Dunyi – Song Dynasty philosopher.
Zhu Xi – one of the leading Neo-Confucians of the Song Dynasty.
Cheng Hao and Cheng Yi also called the cheng Brother's Students of Zhou dunyi works collected by zhu xi

New Confucians 
Tu Wei-Ming – advocate of "New Confucianism"
Xiong Shili – founding figure in "New Confucianism"
Ma Yifu – founding figure in "New Confucianism"

Western Confucians or scholars of Confucianism 
Philip J. Ivanhoe
Robert Cummings Neville
Eric L. Hutton

Other 
Wang Fuzhi
Huang Zongxi
Gu Xiancheng

References

See also 
Disciples of Confucius
List of people by belief
List of Confucian states and dynasties

Confucianists
 
Confucianism-related lists
C